Arnold Koller (born 29 August 1933) is a Swiss politician and member of the Swiss Federal Council (1986–1999).

He was elected to the Federal Council of Switzerland on 10 December 1986 as a member of the Christian Democratic People's Party of Switzerland from the canton of Appenzell Innerrhoden. He handed over office on 30 April 1999.

Arnold Koller was Chairman of the Board of the Second International Conference on Federalism held in St. Gallen in 2002, and of the Forum of Federations from 2006 to 2010. This is an international organisation designed to help develop best practices in countries around the world with federal and devolved systems of government. With Raoul Blindenbacher he is the editor of the book "Federalism in a Changing World" published at McGill-Queens University Press, Montreal 2003. 

During his time in office he held the following departments:
Federal Military Department (1987–1988)
Federal Department of Justice and Police (1989)
Federal Military Department (1989)
Federal Department of Justice and Police (1990–1999)
He was President of the Confederation twice in 1990 and 1997.

Works
Blindenbacher, R. and Koller, A. (eds): Federalism in a Changing World – Learning from Each Other. Montreal: McGill-Queens University Press, 2003

References

External links

1933 births
Living people
People from Appenzell Innerrhoden
Swiss Roman Catholics
Christian Democratic People's Party of Switzerland politicians
Members of the Federal Council (Switzerland)
Members of the National Council (Switzerland)
Presidents of the National Council (Switzerland)
University of St. Gallen alumni
Academic staff of the University of St. Gallen